The 1946 San Francisco State Gators football team represented San Francisco State College (now known as San Francisco State University) as an independent during the 1946 college football season. San Francisco State and  joined Far Western Conference in 1946, but did not play any conference games, and their games did not count in the conference standings. Led by fourth-year head coach Dick Boyle, who return for his second stint after helming the team from 1939 to 1941, the Gators compiled a record of 3–3 and outscored their opponents 71 to 60. They played home games at Cox Stadium in San Francisco.

Schedule

References

San Francisco State
San Francisco State Gators football seasons
San Francisco State Gators football